Rupnagar (formerly known as Ropar) is a city and a municipal council in Rupnagar district in the Indian state of Punjab. Rupnagar is a newly created fifth Divisional Headquarters of Punjab comprising Rupnagar, Mohali, and its adjoining districts. It is also one of the bigger sites belonging to the Indus Valley civilization. It is bordered by Himachal Pradesh to the north and Shahid Bhagat Singh Nagar district to its west.

There are many historical and religious places in Rupnagar, including gurdwaras such as Gurudwara Bhatha Sahib, Gurdwara Bhubour Sahib,Gurdwara Solkhian and Gurudwara Tibbi Sahib.

History

Etymology 
The ancient town of Rupnagar is said to have been named by a  Raja called Rokeshar, who ruled during the 11th century and named it after his son Rup Sen.

Indus Valley civilization 
Rupnagar is one of the Indus Valley sites along the Ghaggar-Hakra beds. There is an Archaeological Museum in the city which was opened in the year 1998 for general public. The museum exhibits the archaeological remains of excavated site in the city, the first Harappan site of Independent India. These excavations reveal a cultural sequence from Harappan to medieval times. Some of the important exhibits include antiquities of Harappan times, gold coins of Chandragupta and copper and bronze implements.

Historical Background 
S. Hari Singh Rais of Sialba conquered Ropar in 1763 A.D. and established his state . S. Hari Singh son Charat Singh made Ropar capital of the state.

S. Hari Singh Rais of Sialba conquered Ropar in 1763 A.D. and established his state. His son Charat Singh made Ropar capital of the state.

Geography 
The town lies on the bank of Satluj River and the Shivalik hill range spreads along the opposite bank of the river.

Climate 
The climate of Rupnagar is characterized by general dryness (except in the south west monsoon season), a hot summer and a cold winter. The year may be divided into four seasons. The period from about middle of November to February is the cold season. This is followed by the summer season from March to about the end of June. The south-west monsoon season commences late in June and continues up to about middle of September. The period from mid September to the middle of November constitutes the post-monsoon or transition season. May and June are generally the hottest months and December and January are the coldest months. Relative humidity is high, averaging about 70% during monsoon. The average annual rainfall in the district is 1030mm. About 78% of the annual rainfall is received during June through September.

Rupnagar wetland

The city has one of the three important wetlands of the Punjab State known as Rupnagar Wetland or Ropar Wetland.It was declared as a Ramsar site in 2002 This is a man-made freshwater wetland covering 1,365 hectares. Also called the Rupnagar Lake, the wetland developed consequent to the construction of a regulator on the Sutlej River. The area has a large number of birds, mammals and vegetation. It has at least 9 mammalian, 154 bird, 35 fish, 9 arthropod, 11 rotifer and 10 protozoan species. This important ecological zone is located in the Shivalik foothills of the Lower Himalayas and was created in 1952 on the Sutlej River, in the Punjab state of India, by building a head regulator. The wetland is surrounded by Shivalik hills to the northwest and by plains to the south and southeast.

Transport

Rail 
Rupnagar railway station falls in the Northern Railway zone of the Indian Railways. It is connected to Chandigarh by a single line railway track. It is also connected to Amritsar via Jalandhar, Ludhiana, Morinda, Una (HP) and Nangal Dam.

Road 
Rupnagar city has a road network to surrounding village and towns in district as well as to major cities including Una, Baddi, Ludhiana, Jalandhar, Chandigarh and Delhi. Rupnagar is connected by the National Highway system to the following nearby cities, by the following highway routes:
  NH 205 that connects Chandigarh, Kurali to Kiratpur Sahib, Himachal Pradesh via Rupnagar
 NH 103A connects Hoshiarpur to Rupnagar.
 NH 344A links Rupnagar to Phagwara, Jalandhar via Nawanshahr, Balachaur and Banga via NH103A at Balachaur.

Demographics 
As per 2011 India census, Rupnagar had a population of 56,038. Males constitute 52.8% of the population and females 47.2%. Rupnagar has an average literacy rate of 82.19%, higher than the national average of 74.04%: male literacy is 87.50%, and female literacy is 76.42%.

Companies 
 Ranbaxy Laboratories
 Smart IT Ventures Private Limited 
 The Australian Academy

Education

Schools 
Rupnagar has public as well as private schools which are affiliated to either Central Board of Secondary Education (CBSE) or Punjab School Education Board (PSEB) and follow the 10+2 plan of education.

Higher education 
Rupnagar houses the Indian Institute of Technology Ropar which is spread over 525 acres in the banks of Satulj, the Institute of Engineering and Technology, Bhaddal, and Government College, Ropar (affiliated to Punjabi University, Patiala).

Notable people

 Himanshi Khurana, Indian model
 Rattan Chand, Senior bureaucrat for the Government of India
 Manpreet Gony, Indian Cricketer
 Kanshi Ram, Indian politician
 Surjit Bindrakhia, Punjabi singer
 Rana K. P. Singh, Indian politician

See also
 Indus Valley civilization
 List of Indus Valley Civilization sites
 List of inventions and discoveries of the Indus Valley Civilization
 Hydraulic engineering of the Indus Valley Civilization
 Bara, Punjab
 Gaggon

References

External links 

 
 Govt. Website on Rupnagar
 Rupnagar BSNL telephone directory search
 Archaeological Museum in Rupnagar (Archaeological Survey of India)
 Location of Ropar in IVC map
 

 
Archaeological sites in Punjab, India
Cities and towns in Rupnagar district
Indus Valley civilisation sites